HX 72 was a North Atlantic convoy of the HX series which ran during the battle of the Atlantic in World War II. The convoy comprised 43 ships of which 11 were sunk and another damaged by German U-boats who suffered no losses.

Background
HX 72 was an east-bound convoy of 43 ships which sailed from Halifax on 9 September 1940 bound for Liverpool and carrying war materials.

The convoy comprised contingents from Halifax, Sydney and Bermuda.

Escorts at this stage of the campaign were generally meagre; convoys generally were unescorted, or had just an armed merchant cruiser (AMC) as protection against surface raiders until reaching the Western Approaches. HX 72's ocean escort was the AMC , though at sunset on 20 September Jervis Bay detached to meet a west-bound convoy.

The U-boat Arm (UBW) was also sparse, able to maintain only a few boats at any one time in the North Atlantic, operating at the edge of the Western Approaches to intercept convoys before their escort had joined.
U-47 was on weather duty, her armament depleted after an attack on Convoy SC 2 earlier that month, and was able only to report contact.

After reporting the convoy Prien shadowed the convoy, while U-boat Control (BdU) summoned all available U-boats.

Action

Otto Kretschmer, in U-99 made contact around midnight of 20/21 September and attacked, hitting Invershannon. Rogers ordered a turn to port to try and shake off the attack, but this failed; U-99 attacked again, hitting Baron Blythswood, which sank, and Elmbank, which was disabled. U-99 and U-47 then attacked Elmbank with gunfire, but she did not sink until morning, at which point U-99 left the scene to return to Lorient.

 arrived before dawn, and sank Blairangus, which was straggling. Rogers dropped smoke and turned again, to try and shake off his pursuers, but failed once more; U-47 and U-48 continued to shadow throughout the daylight on the 21st.

However that afternoon the Western Approaches escort also arrived, causing the U-boats to draw back.

At nightfall on 21/22 September U-100 struck, entering the convoy to attack at close range. Attacking before moonrise Joachim Schepke hit three ships within minutes, causing confusion. , Torinia and Dalcairn were sunk, and the convoy began to scatter in confusion. The escort sought to retaliate, but searched outside the convoy perimeter, where the rest of the pack was gathered; they were unable to find Schepke, but were able to frustrate further attacks. U-48 hit Broompark, which was damaged, but no other boat was successful. She also attacked Harlingen, but was spotted; Harlingen avoided the torpedoes aimed at her, and returned fire with her stern gun, scoring several hits, but causing little damage.

As the convoy broke up, two more ships were hit; U-100 sank Simla, while U-32 damaged Collegian.

This was the end of the action; HX 72 was scattered, but the U-boats were unable to pursue, as the presence of the escorts had forced them to submerge. The remaining ships of HX 72 proceeded independently, while the escorts tried to gather the convoy back together, but no further attacks took place and all remaining ships reached port safely.

Conclusion

HX 72 had lost 11 ships of 72,727 gross register tons, of which Kretschmer sank three and Schepke seven ships.
Whilst undoubtedly a victory, and a vindication of Donitz's wolfpack tactic, most of the UBW's successes were achieved by two of its aces using their high-risk tactic of penetrating the convoy to  attack from within. The other boats following the more traditional approach from the flank, and at longer range, were far less successful.

Table
  
Allied ships sunk

References

External links
HX 72 at convoyweb
HX 72 at uboat.net
 HMS Jervis Bay

HX072
Naval battles of World War II involving Canada
C